The 2022 The Basketball League All-Star Game was held at Liverpool High School on April 16, 2022. Team NBLC was coached by Doug Plumb of the London Lightning, while team TBL was coached by Patrick Beilein of the Syracuse Stallions and Will Brown of the  Albany Patroons.

The TBL defeated NLBC, 155–150. Chris Darrington of the Toledo Glass City B.C was named Most Valuable Player of the All-Star Game. Thomas Garrick of the Jamestown Jackals won the Three-Point Contest.

On February 8, 2022, the league announced that the Syracuse Stallions would host an all star game between National Basketball League of Canada and The Basketball League. 
 On April 11, 2022, it was announced that Plumb would  coach a team representing the NBL Canada, which would compete against the team from the TBL.

All-Star Teams

Rosters

References

 
TBL All-Star Games